Cape Evans is a rocky cape on the west side of Ross Island, Antarctica, forming the north side of the entrance to Erebus Bay.

History
The cape was discovered by the British National Antarctic Expedition, 1901–04, under Robert Falcon Scott, who named it the "Skuary" after the birds. Scott's second expedition, the British Antarctic Expedition, 1910–13, built its headquarters here, renaming the cape for Lieutenant Edward Evans, Royal Navy, second in command of the expedition. Scott's headquarters building still exists and is known as Scott's Hut.

Geography 
A number of features on or around Cape Evans have been charted and individually named by various Antarctic expeditions.

Windvane Hill is a small hill just northeast of the extremity of Cape Evans. It was so named by the second British Antarctic Expedition because an anemometer station was established on this site. The hill was later marked with a memorial cross.

Three lakes - Skua Lake, Algal Lake, and Island Lake - are located on the cape. Skua Lake was named by the second British Antarctic Expedition because of the nearby skua rookery. Midway between Skua Lake and Island Lake is a small, roughly circular meltwater lake called Algal Lake. It was named by United States Antarctic Research Program biologists David T. Mason, Charles R. Goldman and Brian J.B. Wood Jr., who studied the lake in the 1961–62 and 1962–63 seasons. The name derives from the striking mat of blue-green algal remains around the leeward edge of the lake. The final lake is Island Lake, which was apparently also named by members of the second British Antarctic Expedition.

Historic sites and monuments

Scott's Hut has been designated a Historic Site or Monument (HSM 16), following a proposal by New Zealand and the United Kingdom to the Antarctic Treaty Consultative Meeting.

A cross on Windvane Hill, Cape Evans, was erected by the Ross Sea Party, led by Captain Aeneas Mackintosh, of Sir Ernest Shackleton's Imperial Trans-Antarctic Expedition of 1914–1917, in memory of three members of the party who died in the vicinity in 1916: Arnold Spencer-Smith, Aeneas Mackintosh and Victor Hayward. The cross has been designated a Historic Site or Monument (HSM 17), following a proposal by New Zealand and the United Kingdom to the Antarctic Treaty Consultative Meeting.

The whole site is protected as Antarctic Specially Protected Area (ASPA) No.155 largely because of its historic significance as one of the principal sites of early human activity in Antarctica.

References

External links 
 Cape Evans Panoramas – panoramic photographs of Scott's hut at Cape Evans

Evans, Cape
Antarctic Specially Protected Areas
Historic Sites and Monuments of Antarctica